Tilmann Otto (born 19 April 1974), better known by his stage name Gentleman, is a German reggae musician.

Personal life 
Gentleman lives in the Neubrück area of Cologne. He is the son of a Lutheran pastor and is the father of two children, named Samuel and Tamica. He is married to Tamika, a backing singer of the Far East Band, which has supported him since his first concert tour of Germany in 2002. Although regularly on tour and in the studio, Gentleman generally considers himself a rather family oriented person, which becomes apparent in his music projects such as his long-player Journey to Jah, which was inspired by the birth of his first son Samuel. His song Mama from the collaborative album Conversations that he recorded with Ky-Mani Marley deals with his deep spiritual relationship to his mother.

Music 
Gentleman has traveled to Jamaica regularly since he was 18 years old. His career began with the collaboration of the band Freundeskreis which produced the song "Tabula Rasa". After beginning his career as a deejay, he based his style to the classic form of the reggae genre like that of Bob Marley. He sings mainly in English or Jamaican Patois. With songs like "Send a Prayer", Gentleman expresses his deep belief in God. His album, Confidence, climbed to number 1 on the German album charts in 2004. 

Gentleman was featured on the album True Love by Toots and the Maytals, which won the Grammy Award in 2004 for Best Reggae Album. In 2005, Gentleman performed with Mamadee with the song "Lass los" representing North Rhine-Westphalia in the Bundesvision Song Contest 2005, placing 15th with 10 points. 

After ten years releasing music under the label Four Music he moved to Universal in 2010.

Discography

Albums

Singles

EPs
 1999: Heat of the Night
 1999: Jah Jah Never Fail
 2002: Leave Us Alone
 2002: Dem Gone
 2003: Rainy Days
 2003: Runaway
 2004: Superior
 2005: Intoxication
 2005: Send a Prayer
 2006: On We Go / Caan Hold Us Down
 2007: Different Places
 2007: Serenity
 2008: Soulfood / Lack of Love
 2010: It No Pretty
 2010: To the Top
 2010: Lonely Days

DVDs
 2003: Gentleman & The Far East Band Live
 2011: Diversity Live

References

External links

Official website	
Gentleman @ fourmusic.com (as of 2001; archived at the Internet Archive)

1974 births
Living people
Reggae fusion artists
Musicians from Osnabrück
Participants in the Bundesvision Song Contest
German reggae musicians
Echo (music award) winners
VP Records artists